Raven Rotorcraft (also called Raven Redrives and Raven Rotorcraft & Redrives, Inc.) is an American aircraft manufacturer based in El Prado, New Mexico and formerly of Boulder Colorado. The company specializes in the design and manufacture of autogyros in the form of kits for amateur construction and reduction drives for three and four cylinder Geo Metro and Honda automotive engines for aircraft use.

The company produced a very simple single-seat autogyro design in the 1990s, the Raven Explorer I for the US FAR 103 Ultralight Vehicles rules. This was followed by the Raven Explorer II two-seater for the US Experimental - Amateur-built aircraft category. By the 2010s these were both out of production. The company is engaged in developing a new winged autogyro, designated the Raven Rotor-Plane, for the cargo, search and rescue and aerial survey roles.

The company also produces complete aircraft engines for installation in homebuilt aircraft, such as the Raven 1000 UL, 1300 SVS Turbo and 1600 SV.

Aircraft

References

External links

Aircraft manufacturers of the United States
Ultralight aircraft
Homebuilt aircraft
Autogyros